The following are the association football events of the year 2004 throughout the world.

Events
5 January – Manager Mark Wotte leaves Dutch club Willem II Tilburg and becomes technical director at Feyenoord Rotterdam.
29 January – Dutch club Volendam sacks manager Henk Wisman. Former player Johan Steur is named interim-manager.
2 February – South Korean Club Anyang Cheetahs move to Seoul and change their name to FC Seoul.
14 February – Tunisia beat Morocco 2–1 to clinch the first African Cup of Nations in the country's history.
29 February – Middlesbrough beat Bolton Wanderers 2–1 to win the League Cup, the club's first cup in their 128-year history.
25 April – FA Premier League – Arsenal clinch the Premier League title, their second in three years, with four games still to play.
29 April – San Marino record their first ever win, a 1–0 victory over Liechtenstein in a friendly.
2 May – Milan clinch the Italian Serie A title.
8 May – Werder Bremen win the German Bundesliga
8 May – Valencia win the Spanish Primera División.
8 May – Ajax wins the Dutch title in the Eredivisie.
15 May – Arsenal complete their last game of the Premier League season with a victory, becoming the first team to go unbeaten for a whole season in the top division of English football since Preston North End in 1889. FIFA gives the host of the 2010 Football World Cup the first Football World Cup in Africa to South Africa
19 May – Valencia defeat Marseille 2–0 in the UEFA Cup final in Gothenburg, Sweden.
22 May – Manchester United win their record 11th FA Cup, defeating Millwall 3–0.
22 May – Millwall midfielder Curtis Weston, becomes the youngest FA Cup Final player in history at 17 years 119 days, beating the 125-year-old record of James F. M. Prinsep.
26 May – Porto defeat AS Monaco 3–0 in the UEFA Champions League final in Gelsenkirchen, Germany.
26 May – Darren Fletcher captains Scotland to a 1–0 win over Estonia, becoming the youngest Scottish captain in 100 years (aged 20 years, 114 days).
3 June – De Graafschap returns to the Dutch Eredivisie after a 3–2 win over Excelsior Rotterdam in the promotion/relegation play-offs.
26 June – River Plate win the Argentine Clausura League.
30 June – Santo André defeats Flamengo 4–2 on aggregate to clinch the Brazilian Cup.
1 July – Once Caldas (Colombia) defeats Boca Juniors (Argentina) 1–1 on aggregate, 2–0 on penalties to win the Copa Libertadores.
4 July – Greece win the UEFA Euro 2004 football tournament, defeating the host nation Portugal in a 1–0 upset victory.
25 July – Brazil win the Copa América football tournament, defeating Argentina 4–2 on penalties.
26 July – Gerard van der Lem is fired as manager of the Saudi Arabia national football team.
7 August – Japan win the 2004 Asian Cup football tournament, defeating China 3–1.
8 August – Utrecht wins the Johan Cruijff Schaal, the annual opening of the new season in the Eredivisie, for the first time by a 4–2 win over Ajax in the Amsterdam ArenA.
18 August – Marco van Basten makes his debut as the manager of Dutch national team with a 2–2 draw in the friendly against Sweden, replacing criticised Dick Advocaat. Four players make their debut: defender Jan Kromkamp (AZ) and strikers Romeo Castelen (Feyenoord Rotterdam), Dave van den Bergh (Utrecht) and Collins John (Fulham).
26 August – United States win the Olympic women's football tournament, defeating Brazil 2–1 in extra time.
28 August – Argentina win the Olympic men's football tournament, defeating Paraguay 1–0.
1 November – Football Federation Australia launches Australia's new national competition, the A-League, replacing the former National Soccer League.
10 December  
 Newell's Old Boys win the Argentine Apertura League.
 Cienciano defeats Boca Juniors 4–2 on penalties to win the South American Recopa final in Fort Lauderdale, Florida, USA.
12 December – Porto defeats Once Caldas 8–7 on penalties in the Intercontinental Cup final in Yokohama, Japan.
13 December – Dutch club NEC fires manager Johan Neeskens. He is replaced by former player Cees Lok.
17 December – Boca Juniors defeats Bolívar 2–1 on aggregate to win the Copa Sudamericana final in Buenos Aires, Argentina.
19 December – Santos clinch the Brazilian League

Winners of national club championships

Africa
  – Aviação
  – Al-Zamalek
 Morocco – Raja Casablanca
 Mozambique – Ferroviário de Nampula
 Nigeria – Dolphins FC
  – Kaizer Chiefs Football Club
 Tunisia – Espérance

Asia
  – Shenzhen Jianlibao
  – Sun Hei
  – East Bengal Club
  – Persebaya Surabaya
 :
Pro League – Pas Tehran
Azadegan League – Saba Battery
Hazfi Cup – Sepahan
 :
J. League Division 1 – Yokohama F. Marinos
J. League Cup – F.C. Tokyo
Emperor's Cup – Tokyo Verdy 1969 (played 1 January 2005)
  – Perlis
  – WAPDA
  – Al-Gharafa SC
  – Al-Shabab
  – Tampines Rovers FC
  – Suwon Samsung Bluewings
  – BEC Tero Sasana

Europe
  – SK Tirana
  – Principat
  – Pyunik
  – Grazer AK
  – PFC Neftchi
  – Dinamo Minsk
  – Anderlecht
  – Široki Brijeg
  – Lokomotiv Plovdiv
  – Hajduk Split
  – APOEL
  – Baník Ostrava
  – FC Copenhagen
  – Arsenal
  – Levadia Tallinn
  – HB Tórshavn
  – Haka
  – Lyon
  – WIT Georgia
  – Werder Bremen
  – Panathinaikos
  – Ferencváros
  – Fimleikafélag Hafnarfjarðar
  – Shelbourne
  – Maccabi Haifa
  – Milan
  – Kairat Almaty
  – Skonto
  – FBK Kaunas
  – Jeunesse Esch
  – FK Pobeda
  – Sliema Wanderers
  – Sheriff Tiraspol
 
 Eredivisie – Ajax
 Eerste Divisie – Den Bosch
  – Linfield
  – Rosenborg
  – Wisła Kraków
  – Porto
  – Dinamo București
  – Lokomotiv Moscow
  – Pennarossa
  – Celtic
  – Red Star Belgrade
  – MŠK Žilina
  – ND Gorica
  – Valencia
  – Malmö FF
  – FC Basel
  – Fenerbahçe
  – Dynamo Kyiv
  – Rhyl

North America
  – Toronto Croatia (CPSL) 
  – Deportivo Saprissa

Clausura – UNAM
Apertura – UNAM
  – D.C. United (MLS)

Oceania
 Australia – Perth Glory

South America
 Argentina
2003–04 Clausura – River Plate
2004–05 Apertura – Newell's Old Boys
 Bolivia – Bolívar
Torneo Apertura – Bolívar
Torneo Clausura – Oriente Petrolero
 Brazil – Santos
 Chile
Torneo Apertura – Universidad de Chile
Torneo Clausura – Cobreloa
 Ecuador – Deportivo Cuenca
 Paraguay – Cerro Porteño
 Peru – Alianza Lima
 Uruguay – Danubio FC
 Venezuela – Caracas FC

International tournaments
 African Cup of Nations in Tunisia (24 January – 14 February 2004)
 
 
 
 UEFA European Football Championship in Portugal (12 June – 4 July 2004)
 
 
  and 
 Copa América in Peru (6–25 July 2004)
 
 
 
 AFC Asian Cup in China (17 July – 7 August 2004)
 
 
 
 Olympic Games in Greece (11 – 28 August 2004)
Men's Tournament
 
 
 
Women's Tournament

National team results

Europe







South America





Movies
Soccer Dog: European Cup
Männer wie wir (Germany)

Births
19 January — Mohamed Ali Cho, French youth international
23 January – Julio Enciso, Paraguayan international
15 May — Gabriel Slonina, US youth international
1 June — Emirhan İlkhan, Turkish youth international
8 September — Nico Paz, Argentine youth international
20 November – Youssoufa Moukoko, German youth international

Deaths

January

3 January – T. G. Jones (87), Welsh footballer
5 January – Pierre Flamion (79), French footballer
7 January – Mario Zatelli (91), French footballer
24 January – Leonidas Da Silva, Brazilian striker, top scorer at the 1938 FIFA World Cup. (90)
25 January – Miklós Fehér (24), Hungarian footballer

February

 1 February – Ally McLeod (72), Scottish footballer
 11 February – Albeiro Usuriaga (37), Colombian footballer
 21 February – John Charles (73), Welsh footballer
 22 February – Roque Máspoli, Uruguayan goalkeeper, winner of the 1950 FIFA World Cup. (86)
 25 February – Jacques Georges (87), French chief of the French Football Federation
 29 February – Danny Ortiz (27), Guatemalan footballer

March

 1 March – Augusto da Costa, Brazilian defender, captain and runner-up at the 1950 FIFA World Cup. (83)

April

5 April – Fernand Goyvaerts (65), Belgian footballer
20 April – Ronnie Simpson (74), Scottish footballer

May
 14 May – Jesús Gil (71), Spanish chief of Atlético Madrid
 15 May – Bruno Baião (18), Portuguese footballer, captain of the Benfica youth team
 15 May – Henrique Frade, Brazilian striker, third highest goalscorer in the history of Clube de Regatas do Flamengo. (69)

July
 10 July – Manuel Quaresma (49), general secretary of the Portuguese Football Federation
 13 July – Roger Quenolle (79), French footballer
 17 July – Lucien Leduc (85), French footballer
 19 July – Carvalho Leite, Brazilian striker, youngest player and last Brazilian surviving member of the 1930 FIFA World Cup. (92)
 23 July – Bertie Peacock (75), Northern Irish footballer

August

2 August – José Omar Pastoriza (62), Argentinian footballer

September

20 September – Brian Clough (69), English footballer and manager

October

6 October – Nikola Tsanev (65), Bulgarian footballer
7 October – Oscar Heisserer (90), French footballer
12 October – Jean Robin (83), French footballer
17 October – Andreas Sassen (36), German footballer
23 October – Bill Nicholson (85), English footballer and manager
27 October – Serginho (30), Brazilian footballer

November

6 November – Johnny Warren (61), Australian footballer and manager
9 November – Emlyn Hughes (57), English footballer

December

3 December – Raymond Goethals (83), Belgian footballer
5 December – Hicham Zerouali (27), Moroccan footballer
5 December – Cristiano Júnior (24), Brazilian footballer

Clubs founded
 FC Ingolstadt 04

References

 
Association football by year